Namissiguima can refer to:

 Namissiguima Department, Sanmatenga, Burkino Faso
 Namissiguima Department, Yatenga, Burkina Faso